Stavros Pilios (born 10 December 2000) is a Greek professional footballer who plays as a left back for Super League club PAS Giannina.

Career 
Pilios was part of PAS Giannina youth system before he signed a professional contract in January 2019. He made his professional debut against Enosis Aspropyrgos in the greek cup on 2 October 2019. His first appearance in the Super League 2 was against AE Karaiskakis on 22 December 2019.

On 24 August 2021, he was loaned to Iraklis Thessaloniki until the summer of 2022.

Career statistics

Honours
PAS Giannina
 Super League Greece 2: 2019–20

References

2000 births
Living people
Greek footballers
Super League Greece 2 players
Super League Greece players
PAS Giannina F.C. players
Iraklis Thessaloniki F.C. players
Association football forwards
People from Rhodes
Sportspeople from the South Aegean
21st-century Greek people